The Great Lakes Central Railroad  is an American Class II regional railroad, operating in the state of Michigan. It was originally called the Tuscola and Saginaw Bay Railway , which was formed on August 26, 1977, to operate over former Penn Central lines from Millington to Munger, and from Vassar to Colling. TSBY's name was derived from the three counties it operated in: Tuscola, Saginaw and Bay.

Tuscola and Saginaw Bay Railway (1982-2006)

In October 1982, the Michigan Department of Transportation (MDOT) contracted the TSBY to operate the former Ann Arbor Railroad line from Osmer siding just north of Ann Arbor to Alma, Michigan. On October 1, 1984, MDOT cancelled its contract with the Michigan Northern Railway and the TSBY assumed operation as a 405-mile short-line freight railroad with the rest of the Ann Arbor Railroad mainline from Alma to Cadillac, former Grand Rapids and Indiana Railway (GR&I) trackage from Reed City to Petoskey (crossing in Cadillac, Michigan) and Walton to Traverse City and former Chesapeake and Ohio Railway from Grawn to Williamsburg (through Traverse City). The track from Cadillac to Comstock Park and Chesaning to St. Charles were removed in 1991. On January 22, 1991, the TSBY sold its original lines to the Huron and Eastern Railway, now owned by Genesee & Wyoming.

Great Lakes Central Railroad (2006-present)

In March 2006, the Tuscola and Saginaw Bay Railway was purchased by Federated Railways, Inc. and has changed their name to Great Lakes Central Railroad as a class II regional railroad. Great Lakes Central Railroad is the largest regional railroad in the state of Michigan covering  of track.

Current operations

Today the GLC operates former Ann Arbor Railroad track from Ann Arbor to Cadillac, former Pennsylvania Railroad track from Cadillac to Petoskey and Walton to Traverse City, former Chesapeake and Ohio Railway track from Grawn to Williamsburg, former New York Central Railroad track from Owosso to Fergus, and former Grand Trunk Western Railroad track from Ashley to Middleton. The GLC also operates a small portion of the abandoned CSX Ludington Subdivision in Clare, to serve a local plastics factory.

Interchanges

GLC interchanges with Class I railroads Canadian National in Durand and CSX at Howell, and shortlines Huron and Eastern Railway in Durand and Owosso, the Mid-Michigan Railroad in Alma and the Ann Arbor Railroad at Osmer.

References

External links

Official website

Michigan railroads
Regional railroads in the United States